Ahmed Mohamed Marei  (Arabic: أحمد مرعي; born 5 January 1959) is an Egyptian professional basketball coach and former player, currently serving as the head coach for Zamalek SC of the Egyptian Basketball Super League (EBSL). Previously he has also been the head coach of Al Ittihad Alexandria and the Egyptian national team.

Playing career
He played for Egypt’s national team in 1984 when he was a part of its Olympic Team.

Coaching career
Marei coached Al Ittihad Alexandria from 2019 to 2022 and helped the team win the Super League in 2020 and reach the finals in the next two seasons. He also won the Egypt Basketball Cup in 2020 and 2021.
In May 2022, Marei signed to become the head coach of Zamalek.

Personal
Marei is the father of Assem Marei, who has been a playing professionally as well as for the Egyptian national team.

References

External links
Profile at basketball-reference.com

1959 births
Living people
Egyptian men's basketball players
Egyptian basketball coaches
Place of birth missing (living people)
Olympic basketball players of Egypt
Basketball players at the 1984 Summer Olympics
Al Ittihad Alexandria Club basketball coaches
Zamalek SC basketball coaches